HMS Owl was an  of the Royal Navy, launched in 1913. The destroyer was part of the Grand Fleet during the First World War and took part in the Battle of Jutland. Owl survived the war and was sold for scrap in 1921.

Construction and design
Owl was one of three s ordered by the British Admiralty from the London & Glasgow Shipbuilding Company under the 1911–1912 shipbuilding programme, with a total of 20 Acastas (12, including Owl, to the standard Admiralty design and eight more as builder's specials).

The Acastas were larger and more powerful than the s ordered under the previous year's programme. Greater speed was wanted to match large fast destroyers building for foreign navies, while a larger radius of action was desired.

Four Yarrow water-tube boilers fed steam to Parsons steam turbines which drove two propeller shafts. Three funnels were fitted.

Armament consisted of three  guns mounted on the ship's centreline, with one forward and two aft, and two  torpedo tubes. Two reload torpedoes were carried. The ship had a crew of 73 officers and ratings.

Owl was laid down at London & Glasgow's Glasgow shipyard on 1 April 1912, and was launched on 7 May 1913. In 1913 the Admiralty decided to reclassify the Royal Navy's destroyers into alphabetical classes, with the Acasta class becoming the K class. New names were allocated to the ships of the K class, with the name Killer being reserved for Oak, but the ships were not renamed. Oak reached a speed of  during sea trials. She was completed in April 1914.

Service
Owl joined the Fourth Destroyer Flotilla upon commissioning and remained part of that flotilla on the outbreak of the First World War as the flotilla joined the newly created Grand Fleet.

In February 1915,Owl was deployed from Scapa Flow to the Irish Sea as part of a force of two divisions of destroyers sent to hunt the German submarine . By the time the destroyers reached the Irish Sea and began anti-submarine patrols, U-21 had already left the area. Owl, Contest and Christopher ran aground while attempting to turn in the narrow approach channel, remaining aground until the next day. Owl remained at Barrow for repair until 16 February, then sailed to Aberdeen to have her propellers replaced, rejoining the Grand Fleet on 26 February.

Owl was present at the Battle of Jutland on 31 May/1 June 1916. She was detached from the 4th Flotilla to form part of the destroyer screen for the armoured cruisers of the 2nd Cruiser Squadron.

On 5 June 1916 the cruiser  left Scapa Flow carrying the Secretary of State for War, Lord Kitchener who was leading a military mission to Russia. Three hours after leaving Scapa, Hampshire struck a German mine and quickly sank. Owl was part of a large force of ships (consisting of nine destroyers, two yachts and a tug) that set out from Scapa to search for survivors, but only twelve survivors were washed ashore, with 650 men, including Lord Kitchener, killed.

In July 1916, the 4th Flotilla left the Grand Fleet, moving to the Humber, to counter German minelayers and to protect British minesweepers in the North Sea. The flotilla, including Owl, moved again to Portsmouth in November that year. They searched for the submarine, deploying explosive paravanes, but although one of Achatess paravanes detonated during the search, UB-38 escaped unharmed. On 20 December the same three destroyers were ordered to patrol off Ushant in response to U-boat sightings.

The 4th Flotilla was transferred to Devonport in spring 1917. Regular convoy operations on the North Atlantic route began in July 1917, with the destroyers of the 4th Flotilla being used as escorts to escort incoming convoys through the dangerous Western Approaches. As an example, on 9 August 1917, Owl and two more destroyers of the 4th Flotilla rendezvoused with Convoy HS3, inbound from Sydney, Nova Scotia, reinforcing the escort of the convoy to St Helens.

At the end of the war, all pre-war destroyers were quickly withdrawn from active service, and Owl was sold for scrap on 5 November 1921.

Pennant numbers

Footnotes

References

External links
 
Battle of Jutland Crew Lists Project - HMS Owl Crew List

 

Acasta-class destroyers
World War I destroyers of the United Kingdom
1913 ships